Edmund Taite Silk (August 16, 1901 - April 12, 1987) was an American Latinist. He was an associate professor of Latin at Yale University. He was a Guggenheim Fellow in 1942, he curated the classical and medieval manuscripts at the Yale University Library from 1944 to 1959.

References

1901 births
1987 deaths
People from West Haven, Connecticut
Yale University alumni
Yale University faculty
American Latinists